The German Ivory Museum Erbach (Deutsches Elfenbeinmuseum Erbach) is a museum in Erbach im Odenwald, Germany. It was founded in 1966, but the collection was started by Count Francis I in the late 18th century. The city of Erbach then developed to become one of the centres for ivory carving.

The museum exhibition consists of more than two thousand items that represent European, African, Asian, and Greenlandic ivory carving art from the Middle Ages to the present day. One of the focuses is the work of ivory carvers in the Odenwald area in the 19th and 20th centuries, for example Jan Holschuh. 

In early 2006, the museum was modernised and extended. Other ivory museums in this region are the privately owned Ivory Museum Michelstadt and the church-owned Ivory Museum Walldürn.

References

Literature 
 Hans Werner Hegemann: Wegweiser durch das Deutsche Elfenbeinmuseum Erbach. Deutsches Elfenbeinmuseum, Erbach 1979
 Brochures of the German Ivory Museum Erbach.

External links 
 Deutsches Elfenbeinmuseum Erbach
 Deutsches Elfenbeinmuseum Erbach auf der Webseite museen-in-hessen.de

Museums in Erbach im Odenwald
Art museums established in 1966
Decorative arts museums in Germany
Ivory
1966 establishments in West Germany